Brock Jeffrey Pierce (born November 14, 1981) is an American entrepreneur known primarily for his work in the cryptocurrency industry. As a child actor, he starred in Disney films The Mighty Ducks (1992), D2: The Mighty Ducks (1994), and First Kid (1996). He ran as an independent candidate in the 2020 United States presidential election.

Career

Acting 
Pierce was born in Minnesota and appeared in commercials as a toddler. His first major role was playing a young Gordon Bombay in The Mighty Ducks (1992). Pierce reprised the role in D2: The Mighty Ducks. He starred as Luke Davenport in First Kid (1996). Pierce had small roles in Little Big League (1994), Ripper Man (1995), Problem Child 3: Junior in Love (1995), Three Wishes (1995), Earth Minus Zero (1996), and The Ride (1997).

Digital Entertainment Network 
Pierce retired from acting at 16 and joined as a minor partner with Marc Collins-Rector and Chad Schackley in establishing Digital Entertainment Network (DEN), which raised $88 million in venture capital. DEN's goal was to deliver original episodic video content over the Internet aimed at niche audiences. DEN was one of a crop of dot-com startups that focused on the creation and delivery of original video content online in the late 1990s prior to the wide adoption of broadband internet access. Pierce produced its first show, a pilot for gay teenagers called Chad's World. As an 18-year-old, Pierce was making $250,000 a year and held 1% of the company's shares.

DEN was slated for a US$75 million IPO in October 1999, but the IPO was withdrawn in the wake of allegations of sexual assault against Collins-Rector. All three executives subsequently resigned. Layoffs followed in February 2000. While a new executive team led by former Capitol Records President Gary Gersh and former Microsoft executive Greg Carpenter attempted to relaunch in May 2000, DEN filed for bankruptcy and shut down in June 2000.

Internet Gaming Entertainment 
In 2001, Pierce founded Internet Gaming Entertainment (IGE), a company that pioneered the MMORPG currency-selling services industry. Between 2004 and 2005, IGE spent more than $25 million buying out seven smaller competitors, including four auction platforms and a number of fan and content sites. In 2005, Pierce estimated that IGE accounted for about 50% of this online market in the U.S., which has about $500 million in annual volume.

Pierce brought in Steve Bannon, formerly of Goldman Sachs and Breitbart News, to seek venture capital and a deal was made in February 2006 yielding $60 million of which Pierce took away $20 million for a minority stake. The next year the company faced a class-action lawsuit. With no assets, the company failed and Pierce was forced out.

Pierce founded ZAM, a network of websites oriented around massively multiplayer online role-playing games (MMORPG), such as World of Warcraft, Star Wars: The Old Republic, Rift, EverQuest, etc., in 2003. The ZAM.com network included gaming websites such as ZAM.com, Wowhead, Thottbot, Torhead, and D3DB. In March, 2012, Chinese internet and tech giant, Tencent, acquired ZAM.

Titan Gaming/Playsino 
In 2010, Titan Gaming recruited Pierce to sit on its board along with EA Executive Keith McCurdy. Pierce joined other Southern California angel investors, including MP3.com's Michael Robertson, SOA Software's Eric Pulier and William Quigley, and Jim Armstrong of Clearstone Ventures. Also that year, Titan Gaming purchased the rising online gaming network Xfire from Viacom. In October 2011, after Xfire received over $4 million in fresh funding from Intel Capital, Titan Gaming and Xfire cut ties and went their own ways. Titan Gaming and Xfire now operate independently. In late April 2012, Titan Gaming announced that it would be rebranded as Playsino to embark in a complete makeover, with Pierce as the new CEO and $1.5 million of new funding.

As of 2013, Pierce was managing director of the Clearstone Global Gaming Fund a board member of IMI Exchange (a remnant of the IGE restructuring), Xfire, Playsino (having been replaced as CEO in 2013), GoCoin, FGL, Spicy Horse Games, KnCMiner.cn and the Mastercoin Foundation. He was also a member investor of Bit Angels and an investor in BTC China. IMI exchange was subsequently acquired by Moda Inc.

Pierce has been a guest speaker at the Milken Global Conference, Singularity University, and the California Institute of Technology.

Bitcoin and cryptocurrency 
In 2013, Pierce joined brothers Bart and Bradford Stephens in founding venture capital firm Blockchain Capital (BCC) which was reported to have raised $85 million in two venture funds by October 2017. Blockchain Capital raised a third fund using digital security offering on the blockchain, one of the first traded security tokens.

Pierce worked with Mastercoin, a startup that raised capital via an initial coin offering (ICO) in 2013. According to Bloomberg, this “kicked off a worldwide ICO craze, with hundreds of startups raising billions of dollars”.

In March 2014, Pierce and a group of investors filed an offer to purchase the assets of Mt Gox using a Cypriot entity called Sunlot Holdings Ltd. The month before, Mt Gox had shut down operations and filed for bankruptcy in Tokyo after announcing that it had lost 850,000 Bitcoin.

Pierce was elected Director of the Bitcoin Foundation in May 2014. Several members of the Bitcoin Foundation resigned over concerns about the directors. The organization announced its insolvency in July 2015.

In a February 2018 issue of Forbes magazine Pierce was named in the "top 20 wealthiest people in crypto" with an estimated net worth between $700 million and $1.1 billion.

Pierce was a co-founder of the cryptocurrency Tether with Reeve Collins and Craig Sellars in 2014. Tether surpassed Bitcoin in trading volume with the highest daily and monthly trading volume of any cryptocurrency on the market in 2019. Tether is a so-called stablecoin because it allegedly maintains $1 dollar in reserves for each tether issued. In 2020, a court permitted the Attorney General of New York to pursue a claim that Bitfinex, an affiliated exchange, did not disclose the loss of commingled funds. In an interview in July 2020, Pierce said his involvement in Tether ended in 2015 but described Tether as "one of the most important innovations in currency."

Pierce was a co-founder of Block.one, which released EOS.IO software. The ICO raised more than $4 billion, the largest in history. By March 2018, Pierce's role at Block.one had changed to chief strategy officer and he resigned from the company that month to pursue community building.

Pierce led an international delegation to El Salvador in June, 2021, in order to advise the Salvadorian government on their formal adoption of Bitcoin as their national currency.

Real estate 
In 2018, Pierce converted a former monastery in the Old City of San Juan, Puerto Rico into his headquarters.

In 2020, Pierce acquired Dwight Howard's Pierce School Loft in Washington, D.C. Originally built in 1893, the Pierce School Lofts are located in a former schoolhouse named for U.S. President Franklin Pierce. The Pierce School Loft is currently in use as a meeting place for national and local leaders and politicians.

In January 2022, Pierce purchased the W Hotel on the island of Vieques, Puerto Rico, which shuttered in the aftermath of hurricane Maria.

Philanthropy 
Pierce is the vice chair and spokesperson of the U.S. Marines Toys for Tots Foundation of New York, Long Island and Puerto Rico. In late 2021, Pierce funded a new NYPD Gaming Trucks initiative in New York City.

Politics

2020 presidential campaign 

On July 5, 2020, Pierce announced his candidacy for President of the United States in the 2020 election as an Independent. The campaign filed registration documents with the FEC on July 7. Pierce based his campaign around his background as an entrepreneur, and his running mate was Karla Ballard, a fellow entrepreneur. Pierce gained ballot access in Oklahoma on July 15, in Arkansas on August 12, Colorado on August 19. and was nominated by the New York Independence Party on August 24. Pierce was endorsed by venture capitalist and Bitcoin advocate Tim Draper. Pierce was also backed up by singer and entrepreneur Akon, who managed his presidential campaign as chief strategist. Pierce received just 0.03% of the votes in the election. On September 14, he announced that he would form a new party and run candidates in 2022. Jesse Ventura, former Minnesota governor, mayor, actor, and professional wrestler, also endorsed Pierce.

Pierce proposed "America 2.0", with a government that embraces technology, and believes technology is the biggest issue for the United States' future. Pierce has said that he would institute a universal basic income, which could be enabled by digital currencies. He also supports a single-payer health-care system and the legalization of marijuana. Stating that the war on drugs has failed, he advocates ending federal enforcement and to pardon and expunge all non-violent cannabis crimes. Pierce has criticized the two-party system and has stated that he intends to start a major third party.

The Free & Equal Elections Foundation hosted the Second Open Presidential Debate on October 8, 2020, in Denver, Colorado, with participation limited to candidates on the ballot in at least eight states. Participants in the debate included Pierce alongside Howie Hawkins of the Green Party, Brian Carroll of the American Solidarity Party, Don Blankenship of the Constitution Party; and Gloria La Riva of the Party for Socialism & Liberation.

In Casper, Wyoming, Pierce announced the Independent National Convention, to be held in Cheyenne, Wyoming on October 23–24, 2020. Pierce said the convention would include minor, third-party candidates to share their message. Pierce invited independent candidate Kanye West to attend the convention along with five other confirmed independent candidates. Pierce is the only independent candidate to appear on the Wyoming ballot.

On October 13, 2020, Pierce became the first presidential candidate in U.S. history to receive a vote through an app on a personal mobile phone using blockchain technology, in Utah County using the Voatz app.

He received the endorsement of the Independence Party of New York and the Independent Party of Florida.

2022 Senate campaign

In November 2021, Pierce filed a statement of organization with the FEC and later confirmed he was considering a 2022 run for the United States Senate to replace retiring Vermont senator Patrick Leahy After news reports indicated Pierce could lose his federal income tax-free status as a Puerto Rico resident by running in Vermont, he did not file to qualify for the ballot.

Personal life 
He is married to Crystal Rose, CEO of Sensay and co-chairman of the United Council of Rising Nations.

In 2000, three former DEN employees filed a lawsuit against Marc Collins-Rector and Pierce alleging that they provided the plaintiffs with drugs and pressured them for sex when Pierce and one of the plaintiffs were still teenagers. Pierce, along with the other two DEN employees, fled the United States. They were arrested by Interpol in 2002 in Marbella, Spain. Pierce was released without being charged. Rector eventually pleaded guilty and left the United States. 

The three plaintiffs voluntarily dismissed all charges against Pierce without receiving any compensation. Court records show that Pierce paid $21,600 to one of the plaintiff's attorneys because said attorney refused to file the order of dismissal requested by his client until the attorney's expenses were reimbursed.

In 2017, he relocated to Puerto Rico along with other traders, becoming the leader of a group focused on building a utopia on the island in the aftermath of Hurricane Maria.

Filmography

References

External links 

 

1980 births
Living people
20th-century American male actors
21st-century American businesspeople
American male child actors
Male actors from Minnesota
People associated with cryptocurrency
Candidates in the 2020 United States presidential election
Businesspeople from Minnesota